Module, modular and modularity may refer to the concept of modularity. They may also refer to:

Computing and engineering
 Modular design, the engineering discipline of designing complex devices using separately designed sub-components
 Modular function deployment, a method in systems engineering and product development
 Module, a measure of a gear's pitch
 Ontology modularization, a methodological principle in ontology engineering

Computer software
 Modular programming, a software design technique
 Loadable kernel module, an object file that contains code to extend the running kernel
 Environment Modules, a software tool designed to help users manage their UNIX or Linux shell environment
 Modula-2 or Modula-3, programming languages which stress the use of modules

Computer hardware
 Computer module, an early packaging technique that combined several electronic components to produce a single logic element
 Memory module, a physical "stick" of RAM, an essential piece of computer hardware
 Multi-chip module, a modern technique that combines several complex computer chips into a single larger unit

Science and mathematics
 Module (mathematics) over a ring, a generalization of vector spaces
 Modular lattice a kind of partially ordered set
 Modularity theorem (formerly Taniyama–Shimura conjecture), a connection between elliptic curves and modular forms
 Module, in connection with modular decomposition of a graph, a kind of generalisation of graph components
 Modularity (networks), a benefit function that measures the quality of a division of a Complex network into communities
 Protein module or protein domain, a section of a protein with its own distinct conformation, often conserved in evolution
 A cis-regulatory module, a stretch of DNA containing a number of genes that share joint regulation by the same transcription factors

Music
 Module (musician), the solo project of New Zealand-based musician/producer Jeramiah Ross
 Module file, a family of music file formats
 Modular Recordings, a record label
 Modular synthesizer, a type of electronic musical instrument
 Sound module, electronic musical instrument without a human-playable interface

Other uses
 Modular building: prefabricated building that consists of repeated sections called modules, used as house or other, some of them open source, in this case, open source hardware.
 NTC Module, a Russian research and development center
ModulArt, a technique used in contemporary art where a large-structure painting is made up of multiple smaller modules.
 Ford Modular engine, Ford's line of OHC V8 and V10 motors
 Volvo Modular engine
 Game module or expansion, an add-on publication for a role-playing game
 Adventure (Dungeons & Dragons), formerly referred to as a module
 Vitruvian module, an architectural measure
 A class, course, or unit of education covering a single topic

See also
 Modulus (disambiguation)
 Atomicity (disambiguation)
 Modul University Vienna
 Modulon